Ambush Valley is a 1936 American Western directed by Bernard B. Ray and starring Bob Custer and Victoria Vinton. It was produced by Ray and Harry S. Webb for Reliable Pictures.

Premise
Familial relations, government land, impertinent landowners and incoming settlers combine in tragedy and gunplay.

Cast 
 Bob Custer as Bruce
 Victoria Vinton as Ann
 Vane Calvert as Ma Potter
 Philip Phillips as Clay
 Hal Taliaferro (as Wally Wales) as Joel 
 Oscar Gahan as Diggs
 Ed Cassidy as Nester
 Victor Adamson (as Denver Dixon) as Nester
 Wally West as Nester
 Jimmy Aubrey (as Jack Anderson) as Father
 Jack Gilman as Son
 Oklahoma Rangers as Musicians

DVD release 
The film was released on DVD on 22 March 2005 by Sinister Cinema.

External links 
 
 

1936 films
1936 Western (genre) films
American black-and-white films
American Western (genre) films
Films directed by Bernard B. Ray
Reliable Pictures films
1930s English-language films
1930s American films